The Kiev Military District (abbreviated ) was a military district of the Imperial Russian Army and subsequently of the Red Army and Soviet Armed Forces. It was first formed in 1862, and was headquartered in Kiev (Kyiv) for most of its existence.

Imperial Russian Army Formation

The Kiev Military District was a Military District, a territorial division type utilised to provide more efficient management of army units, their training and other operations activities related to combat readiness. The district originally covered the Kiev Governorate, Podolia Governorate (less Balta County), and Volhynia Governorate.

Assigned formations included the 10th Army.

In 1888 the Kharkov Military District was merged into the Kiev Military District.

With the start of World War I the district was transformed into the 3rd Army. In April 1917 Poltava and Kursk governorates were transferred under the administration of the Moscow Military District.

After the October Revolution in Petrograd the district came under jurisdiction of the Ukrainian People's Republic and existed until (early February 1918) the advance of the Petrograd-Moscow Red Guards forces of the Antonov's Task Force that was charged to fight counter-revolution in the Southern Russia.

The district was not reinstated during brief Bolshevik period in 1918 nor after the establishment of the Ukrainian State.

Commanders (Russian Empire)
 Lieutenant General Prince Illarion Vasilchikov (July 6, 1862 - November 12, 1862*)
 Lieutenant General Count Adam Rzhevusky (temporary in November 1862)
 Colonel General Nicholas Annenkov (December 1862? - January 19, 1865)
 Colonel General Aleksandr Bezak (January 19, 1865 - December 30, 1868*)
 Lieutenant General Nikolai Kozlyaninov (January 6, 1869 - May 1, 1872)
 Lieutenant General Prince Aleksandr Dondukov-Korsakov (temporary January - April 1877)
 Lieutenant General Mikhail Chertkov (temporary September 13, 1877 - April 15, 1878)
 Lieutenant General Mikhail Chertkov (September 15, 1878 - January 13, 1881)
 Colonel General Alexander Drenteln (January 13, 1881 - July 15, 1888*)
 Colonel General Fyodor Radetsky (October 31, 1888? - 1889)
 Colonel General Mikhail Dragomirov (January 1, 1889 - December 24, 1903)
 Lieutenant General Nikolai Kleigels (December 24, 1903 - October 19, 1905)
 Lieutenant General Vladimir Sukhomlinov (October 19, 1905 - December 2, 1908, since 1906 Colonel General)
 Colonel General Nikolay Ivanov (December 2, 1908 - July 19, 1914)
 Lieutenant General Nikolai Khodorovich (April 16, 1916 - 1917)

Commanders (after Revolution)
 Colonel Konstantin Oberuchev (commissar of Provisional Government March - May 1917)
 Major General Konstantin Oberuchev (May 1917 - October 17, 1917)
 Lieutenant General Mikhail Kvetsinsky (October 17, 1917 - November 7, 1917)

Major conflicts
 January Uprising (pro-Polish insurgency)
 Revolution of 1905
 World War I (1914-1917)

First Ukrainian Army Formation

Commanders
 Lieutenant Colonel Viktor Pavlenko (November 14, 1917 - December 13, 1917)
 Captain Mykola Shynkar (December 13, 1917 - 1918)

Major conflicts
 Bolshevik insurgency (1917)
 Ukrainian - Soviet War (1917-1918)

First Red Army Formation
The district was reinstated on March 12, 1919, and then again disbanded on August 23, 1919, with the advance of the Denikin's forces.

Kiev Military Region (Oblast)
The Kiev Military Region was formed by the Denikin's forces on August 31, 1919, but already on December 14, 1919, its forces were retrieved and merged with the Forces of Novorossiysk Region. Commander of the military district was Abram Dragomirov.

Soviet Armed Forces of Ukraine and Crimea Formation

The District was formed again in January 1920.

In the early 1920s, the District included the following divisions:
3rd Crimea Rifle Division
7th Chernigov Rifle Division
15th Sivashsk Division
24th Samaro-Simbirsk Iron Rifle Division
25th Chapaev Rifle Division
30th Irkutsk Rifle Division
44th Kiev Mountain Rifle Division
45th Volhynia Rifle Division
51st Perekop Rifle Division

Ukrainian Military District
In April 1922 the Kiev Military District was merged with the Kharkov Military District into South-Western Military District. In June 1922 it was renamed into the Ukrainian Military District.

The 6th Rifle Corps was formed on the orders of the Commander of the Armed Forces of Ukraine and Crimea number 627/162 from May 23, 1922, in Kiev, part of Kiev and Kharkov Military District.

Commanders
 Mikhail Frunze - 1922 - 1924
 Alexander Yegorov - 1924 - 1925
 Iona Yakir - 1925 - 1935

Second Red Army Formation
On May 17, 1935 the Ukrainian Military District was split between the Kharkov Military District and the Kiev Military District.

13th Rifle Corps was reformed in the district by a District order of December 1936, and its headquarters was established at Belaya Tserkov.

On July 26, 1939, the district was renamed into the Kiev Special Military District.

On February 20, 1941, the district formed the 22nd Mechanized Corps (which had 527 tanks) in the 5th Army (Soviet Union), the 16th Mechanized Corps (which had 372 tanks) in the 12th Army, and the 9th mechanized Corps (had 94 tanks), the 24th mechanized Corps (which had 56 tanks), the 15th mechanized Corps (which had 707 tanks), and the 19th Mechanized Corps (had 274 tanks ) in the reserve of the district. Air Defence Forces within the District included the 36th Fighter Aviation Division of the PVO located at Vasylkiv.

When the German Operation Barbarossa began on 22 June 1941, on the base of the Kiev Special Military District was created the Soviet Southwestern Front that on September 10, 1941, completely integrated the district.

Commanders
 Komandarm 1st rank Iona Yakir - 1935 - 1937
 Komandarm 1st rank Ivan Fedko - 1937 - 1938
 Komandarm 2nd rank Semyon Timoshenko - 1938 - 1940
 General of the Army Georgy Zhukov - 1940 - 1941
 Colonel General Mikhail Kirponos - 1941
 Lieutenant General Vsevolod Yakovlev - 1941

Soviet Army Formation

The District was formed again on 25 October 1943, with the Headquarters in Kiev. In June 1946, 7 oblasts of the disbanded Kharkov Military District were added to the Kiev Military District. The District now included the oblasts (provinces) of Kiev, Cherkasy, Uman, Voroshilovgrad, Dnipropetrovsk, Poltava, Stalin, Sumy, Kharkiv and Chernihiv.

Units stationed in the District were 1st Guards Army and 6th Guards Tank Army. 69th Air Army was active from the early 1950s to at least 1964 in the district.(See :ru:Колесник, Василий Артёмович) In 1959 the 17th Air Army was relocated to the District from Mongolia to provide air support. The 60th Corps of the 8th Air Defense Army provided air defense for the District.

The 43rd Rocket Army of the Strategic Rocket Forces was formed at Vinnitsa within the District's boundaries in 1960. It comprised the 19th Rocket Division (Khmelnitsky), 37th Guards Rocket Division (Lutsk), 43rd Rocket Division (Kremenchug), 44th Rocket Division (Kolomyia, Ivano-Frankovsk Oblast, disbanded 31 March 1990. Previously 73rd Engineer Brigade RVGK at Kamyshin.), and the 46th Rocket Division (Pervomaisk, Mykolaiv Oblast). The 43rd Rocket Army's last commander was Colonel-General Vladimir Alekseevich Mikhtyuk, who served from 10.1.1991 to 8.5.1996. It was finally disbanded on 8 May 1996.

Also in the district in 1988 was the 72nd Центральная артиллерийская база вооружения (средств управления), at Krasnograd. (Feskov et al. 2004, 56)

In 1991 the district included 6th Guards Tank Army at Dnipropetrovsk, 1st Guards Army at Chernihiv, 36th Motor Rifle Division (Artemovsk), 48th Motor Rifle Division (Chuguev) and the 48th Guards Tank Training Division (Desna), the 9th independent Special Forces Brigade GRU (activated 15.10.62 in Kirovograd, Kirovograd Oblast, Kiev Military District, formation complete 31.12.62., taken over by Ukraine 1992) the 17th Air Army, and the 60th Air Defence Corps of the 8th Air Defence Army (Soviet Air Defence Forces). Among the district's air force units were the Chernigov Higher Military Aviation School of Pilots at Chernigov.

Also located within the district's boundaries but responsible to HQ South-Western Strategic Direction was the 23rd independent Landing-Assault Brigade (effectively an airmobile brigade), at Kremenchug, Poltava Oblast.

In 1991, Colonel General Viktor S. Chechevatov was dismissed as District commander for refusing to take an oath of loyalty to Ukraine.
The District was disbanded after the dissolution of the Soviet Union, by 1 November 1992, and its structure utilized as the basis for the new Ukrainian Ministry of Defense and General Staff.

Commanders
 Lieutenant General Viktor Kosyakin - 1943 - 1944
 Lieutenant General Vasyl Herasymenko - 1944 - 1945
 Colonel General Andrei Grechko - 9 July 1945 - 25 May 1953
 Marshal of the Soviet Union Vasily Chuikov - 26 May 1953 - April 1960
 General of the Army Pyotr Koshevoy - April 1960 - January 1965
 General of the Army Ivan Yakubovsky - January 1965 - April 1967
 Colonel General Viktor Kulikov - April 1967 - 1969
 Colonel General Grigoriy Salmanov - April 1969 - 1975
 Colonel General Ivan Gerasimov - 1975 - 1984
 Colonel General Vladimir Osipov - 1984 - 1989
 Colonel General Boris Gromov - 1989 - December 1990
 Colonel General Viktor Chechevatov - January 1991 - 1992

Second Ukrainian Army Formation

Commanders
 Lieutenant General Valentyn Boryskin (1992)

See also
 Operational Command North, Ukraine

References

Further reading
The Red Kiev. Studies in the History of the Red Banner Kiev Military District (1919-1979). Second edition, revised and expanded. Kiev, Ukraine Political Literature Publishing House. 1979.

Military districts of the Soviet Union
Military districts of the Russian Empire
Military districts of Ukraine
Military units and formations established in 1862
Military units and formations disestablished in 1992
1862 establishments in the Russian Empire